Heinrich Malan (6 April 1981) is a South African  cricket coach and former first-class cricketer. He is the current head coach of Irish cricket team.

Coaching career
He was head coach of Central Districts Stags from June 2013 to March 2019, coaching the side to five national titles - the one-day Ford Trophy in 2014/15 and 2015/16, Burger King Super Smash T20 in 2018/19, and first-class Plunket Shield in 2019/19.

In April 2019 he was appointed head coach of the Auckland Aces (Auckland Cricket Association).

In January 2022, Cricket Ireland appointed Malan as the head coach of Irish cricket team for a three-year contract.

References

External links

1981 births
Living people
South African cricketers
Northerns cricketers
Cricketers from Pretoria
South African cricket coaches
Coaches of the Irish national cricket team